James Bardsley may refer to:
 James Lomax Bardsley (1801–1876), English physician
 James Bardsley (priest) (1805–1886), English cleric of evangelical views